The Alb (also: Hauensteiner Alb) is a river in the southern Black Forest.  It arises from two headwaters, the Menzenschwander Alb and Bernauer Alb, and flows in a southerly direction. It ends after  (including Menzenschwander Alb) at a confluence with the High Rhine at Albbruck.

Etymology 
The name Alb is possibly derived from a Proto-Indo-European word *albhos meaning "white" or perhaps "river".

Headwaters 
The headwaters of the Menzenschwander Alb lie on the southern slope of the Feldberg mountain range in the Landkreis of Breisgau-Hochschwarzwald. The Bernauer Alb rises on the southern slope of the Herzogenhorn.

The valleys of both headwaters were widened by glaciers during the ice age. The Bernau valley is a broad basin, characterized by moraines, marshy valleys, ravines, and Roche moutonnées. The hamlets and isolated farms that make up the valley lie some distance above the frost-prone valley floor.

The glacial features in the Menzenschwand valley are even more striking.  The Menzenschwander Kluse is a well-known terminal moraine.  Below the Kluse, the Menzenschwand Alb plunges with several waterfalls through a small ravine to a basin created by the former Krunkelbach valley glacier.

Middle reaches 
The area occupied by the municipality of Sankt Blasien's area is dominated by the classicist dome of Sankt Blasien's Cathedral. The Alb, like most rivers in this part of the Black Forest, then changes its course by about 60 degrees, towards the south. This is thought to be caused by tectonic movements of the Earth's crust, which have increased the gradient to the High Rhine. The only valley that continues in a south-eastern direction is about  higher, in the saddle near Häusern.

Below this bend, the Alb water is collected in a reservoir, the Alb Basin. Most of the water is piped to the Schwarzabruck reservoir. Both reservoirs are owned by the Schluchseewerk AG.

The valley is no longer bordered by narrow, wooded ridges, but instead by the undulating Hotzenwald plateau in the municipalities of Dachsberg und Höchenschwand. The plateau is indented by bogs and rocky hilltops.

During the Würm ice age, the Alb glacier ended at the point where we now find the village of Niedermühle. Downstream of Niedermühle, the valley is very narrow, leaving no room for settlements.

Alb Gorge 

The Ibach and Höllbach join from the right, each emerging from its own narrow gorge. The Höllbach has two waterfalls in this area. Because the gorge is so narrow, the road is up to  higher, on the left bank. On a wider spot in the valley, is the saw mill Tiefenstein and two tributaries, Schildbach and Steinbach. Halfway up the slope, there are granite quarries and the ruins of two castles.  

Long ago, the Alb followed a different course and flowed to Hauenstein through the valley now occupied by the Mühlbach. This route was blocked by glacial deposits during an earlier ice age, forcing the Alb to find a new route to the Rhine. Since then, the "new" gorge cuts through the granite rock. This section cannot be travelled without special equipment, even though the water flow is usually low, because most of the water has been diverted. It there is sufficient water, canoeing is possible, although this is considered the most difficult stretch of whitewater in Germany. From the hamlet Hohenfels, the road descends to the valley floor at Albbruck, where the Alb flows into the High Rhine.

Gallery

See also 
 Alb (Northern Black Forest)

Footnotes 

Rivers of Baden-Württemberg
Rivers of the Black Forest
Rivers of Germany